John Kerr (c.1925 – 25 April 2006) was an Irish ballad singer from Coolback, Fanad, County Donegal, Ireland.

The family name was actually Carr. His family ran a local shop in Coolback and  his brother James was a shoe maker and cobbler.

His best-known recording is Three Leafed Shamrock which reached number 1 in the singles charts of the Republic of Ireland on 1 April 1972.

Kerr came into the business during the showband era as a lead singer with the Classic Showband. In the late 60's his decided to retire from the bandstand and the recording of Mulroy Bay was intended to be his swan song, but the song was such a success that it launched Kerr into a solo career.  His success was followed by a further number 1 song "Three leaf Shamrock" John went on to record fourteen albums during his career which continued right up to his 80th year.

Kerr ran a shop in Bridgetown, Kerrykeel until the turn of the century.

He started out as a shoe repairer and built a small drapery business that served both the tourist trade and local needs.    He was Kerrykeel's number 1 son.

Year of birth uncertain
2006 deaths
Irish folk singers
Irish male singers
Musicians from County Donegal